Beinn Bhàn is a mountain in the highlands of Scotland, lying on the Applecross peninsula, on the north side of Loch Kishorn.

The most striking features of Beinn Bhàn are the rocky corries on the eastern side, which are seen well from the A896 road. The best known of the corries is probably Coire na Poite, which forms a bowl shape, almost entirely ringed by crags offering climbing and winter ice climbing routes. The summit of Beinn Bhàn lies directly above the corries floor, which has two small lochans.

The ridges between the corries offer several routes to the summit for scramblers. An alternative route for those without a head for heights involves ascending the grassy southwest ridge of the peak, starting from near the point where the Bealach na Bà leaves the A896, a distance of some 4 kilometres.

A slightly longer route to the summit, involving far less ascent, may be had from the top of the Bealach na Bà (over 600 m above sea level), skirting below the northern top of Sgurr a'Chaorachain to reach the bealach separating the aforementioned peak from Beinn Bhàn.

An ascent of Beinn Bhàn is often combined with the climbing of Sgurr a'Chaorachain.

Corbetts
Marilyns of Scotland
Mountains and hills of the Northwest Highlands
Climbing areas of Scotland